The men's 1500 metres event at the 2000 Asian Athletics Championships was held in Jakarta, Indonesia on 28–30 August.

Medalists

Results

Heats

Final

References

2000 Asian Athletics Championships
1500 metres at the Asian Athletics Championships